Thon is a given name and a surname.

Given name
Thon Maker (born 1997), Australian basketballer
Thon Moreira or Thon Thomas, nicknames of Hilton Moreira (born 1981), Brazilian footballer

Surname
Dickie Thon (born 1958), American baseball player
Konstantin Thon (1794–1881), Russian architect
Melanie Rae Thon (born 1957), American writer
Nikolaos Thon (1850–1906), Greek businessman
Olaf Thon (born 1966), German footballer
Olav Thon (born 1923), Norwegian businessman
Øyvin Thon (born 1958), Norwegian orienteering competitor,
Ozjasz Thon (1870–1936), Polish rabbi
Sixtus Armin Thon (1817 - 1901), German artist
William G. Thon (1886–1953), American lawyer and politician

See also

Than (disambiguation)
Thaon (surname)
Thoen (name)
Thom
Thon (disambiguation)
Thony (name)
Thorn (surname)
Thun (disambiguation)
Ton (given name)
Toon (name)

German-language surnames
Norwegian-language surnames